Mieczysław Palus (31 August 1921 – 15 May 1986) was a Polish ice hockey player. He played for Pogoń Lwów, Spartak Lviv, Wisła Krakow, Cracovia, and Legia Warsaw during his career. He won the Polish league championship in 1949 with Cracovia, and seven more times from 1951 to 1957 with Legia. Palus also played for the Polish national team at the 1948 Winter Olympics, and the 1947 World Championship. He served as a co-coach for Poland at the 1956 Winter Olympics.

References

External links

1921 births
1986 deaths
Ice hockey players at the 1948 Winter Olympics
MKS Cracovia (ice hockey) players
Legia Warsaw (ice hockey) players
Olympic ice hockey players of Poland
People from Rzeszów County
Poland men's national ice hockey team coaches
Polish ice hockey coaches
Polish ice hockey forwards
Sportspeople from Podkarpackie Voivodeship